Major General Engineer Fadel Mohammed Ali (اللواء المهندس فضل محمد علي) (2010–1945) was the Director of Royal Maintenance Corps of the Jordanian Armed Forces responsible for supporting continuous operations for the military, until the year 2001.

Early life 
Fadel was born in Ramla in 1945. He finished his GCSE from Ramala in 1965 ranking 4th among all his peers that graduated in 1964 in Jordan.

Education
Fadel pursued his bachelor's degree in Electrical Engineering at Alexandria University, Egypt, and graduated in 1970 ranking one of the top 10 graduates. After joining the Army, he was sent in a scholarship to Dallas, Texas, United States, where he finished his master's degree from Southern Methodist University in 1978 with an honors ranking. During his military career, he passed many training courses in the US, UK & France.

Scientific Research Papers

 Computer Applications in Modern Military Equipment and Army Maintenance Approach
Prepared for the University of Jordan, Faculty of Engineering and Technology

 Calibration Policy and Requirements
Paper prepared when The Arab Organization for Standardization and Metrology (ASMO) organized a Symposium on Metrology for the Development of Arab Countries in cooperation with the University of Jordan.

 Laboratory Electronic Equipment Maintenance
This paper had been prepared when the University of Jordan, Faculty of Engineering and Technology, organized a Regional Symposium on Laboratory Equipment Maintenance in cooperation with the UNESCO Regional Office for science and Technology in the Arab countries (ROSTAS).

 National Information Bank for Electronic Instruments
Prepared for the General Headquarters of the Jordanian Armed Forces (JAF) according to Prince AL-HASSAN instructions during his meeting with the JAF Engineers

 National Computer Software Center, Jordan
Prepared for the National Resources Development Company, Amman – Jordan

 Laser and Night Vision Equipment
-	Infra - Red Thermal Imagining Systems 
-	Image Intensifier Tube Night Vision Systems 
-	LASER Tank Fire Control Systems, LTFCS 
-	Wire Guided Missiles 
-	LASER Simulating Systems, LSS 
-	LASER (Characteristics, Types, Elements, Civilian & Military Applications)

Positions held
 1972–1980	Chief of the Armored Vehicles, Guided Weapons and Electronic Sections
 1980–1984	Chief of the Technical Research and Development Branch at DRMC
 1984–1990	Commander of the Electronic Equipment Workshops
 1990–1992	Head of the Technical Division (Directorate of the Royal Maintenance Corps, DRMC)
 1992–2000	Commander of the Electronic Equipment Workshops
 2000–2001	Director of ‘The Royal Maintenance Corps’ – Jordan Armed Forces
 2001–2003	King Abdullah II Design & Development Bureau (KADDB) Technical Consultant. CLS-Jordan Associate Director / KADDB
 2003–2005 	Prince Faisal IT Center (PFITC) Director General / KADDB
 2005–2008	Technical Consultant for both Jordanian ESARSV and an American company, VSE
 2008–2010	Owner Representative / Chief of Engineering Department at Tala Bay

References

External links 
 Royal Jordanian Maintenance Corps
 Jordanian Armed Forces

1945 births
2010 deaths
Alexandria University alumni
Southern Methodist University